NGC 174 is a barred spiral or lenticular galaxy around 159 million light-years away in the constellation Sculptor. It was discovered on 27 September 1834 by astronomer John Herschel.

Observation history 
When Herschel discovered the galaxy, he logged "faint, small, little extended, among several bright stars". After a second and third sweep, he noted an exact position which matches PGC 2206. As of such, the two objects are generally referred to as the same. The galaxy was later catalogued by John Louis Emil Dreyer in the New General Catalogue, where Herschel's original note was largely adopted, as the object was described as "extremely faint, small, very little extended, among bright stars".

Description 
The galaxy appears very dim in the sky as it only has an apparent visual magnitude of approximately 14 and thus can only be observed with telescopes. It can be classified as type G using the Hubble Sequence. The object's distance of roughly 159 million light-years from the Solar System can be estimated using its redshift and Hubble's law.

See also 
 List of NGC objects (1–1000)

References

External links 
 
 SEDS

0174
02206
-05-02-028
J00365892-2928403
Sculptor (constellation)
Astronomical objects discovered in 1834
Discoveries by John Herschel
Barred spiral galaxies